Amayo no Sanbai Kigen (雨夜三盃機嫌) is an illustrated book depicting forty-four Kamigata kabuki actors of the time. It was originally published in 1693 as a woodblock printed book by Bokutekian and Sōgyū.

Some of the actors included are:
Ogino Samanojō I
Yamashita Saizaburō
Mizuki Tatsunosuke I
Sodeoka Masanosuke
Tamamura Tsuyanosuke
Yoshizawa Ayame I
Onogawa Ugenji
Saruwaka Kosanza
Sodesaki Karyū I
Sakata Tōkurō
Iwai Heijirō
Sodesaki Iroha

References
Amayo no Sanbai Kigen at Kabuki21.com (with images)

Kabuki
Japanese books
Ukiyo-e